Irné Philip Herbst (born 4 May 1993) is a South African rugby union player, currently playing with English team Harlequins in the Premiership Rugby. His regular position is lock.

Rugby career

Schoolboy rugby
Herbst was born in Witbank and earned a call-up to represent Mpumalanga at primary school level at the Under-13 Craven Week in 2006. He was included in a South Africa Schools squad that beat their counterparts from France 21–14 in August 2011.

Youth and Varsity Cup rugby

He was selected in the South Africa Under-20 squad that played in the 2013 IRB Junior World Championship held in France. He started all five of their matches in the tournament, scoring a try in their semi-final defeat to Wales, a result which eliminated South Africa from the competition, eventually finishing third after beating New Zealand in their final match.

Herbst returned to domestic action in South Africa by making twelve appearances for the  team in the 2013 Under-21 Provincial Championship.

He played in the 2014 Varsity Cup competition for Pretoria-based university side , making four appearances, and then made a further eleven starts for the Blue Bulls U21s in the 2013 edition of the Under-21 Provincial Championship. In a repeat of the 2013 final, they again faced Western Province, but turned the tables on this occasion, winning the match 20–10 to be crowned champions.

Herbst's 2015 season again started with him representing  in the Varsity Cup, where he made seven starts. He was also named in a Varsity Cup Dream Team at the conclusion of the tournament and played in their match against the South Africa Under-20 squad as they prepared for the 2015 World Rugby Under 20 Championship. However, he then suffered a knee injury that kept him out for the entire season.

Europe
In 2017 Herbst signed for Italian team Benetton. He played in Italy until 2021−22 season. 

On 5 May 2022, Herbst moved to England to join Harlequins in the Premiership Rugby ahead of the 2022-23 season.

References

South African rugby union players
Living people
1993 births
People from Witbank
Rugby union locks
Blue Bulls players
South Africa Under-20 international rugby union players
Southern Kings players
Benetton Rugby players
Rugby union players from Mpumalanga